The Kosovo women's national football team represents Kosovo in international women's football and is controlled by the Football Federation of Kosovo.

History

Permitting by FIFA to play friendlies
On 6 February 2013, FIFA gave the permission to play international friendly games against other member associations. Whereas, on 13 January 2014, there was a change of this permit that forbade Kosovo to play against the national teams of the countries of the former Yugoslavia. Club teams were also allowed to play friendlies and this happened after a FIFA Emergency Committee meeting. However, it was stipulated that clubs and representative teams of the Football Federation of Kosovo may not display national symbols as flags, emblems, etc. or play national anthems. The go-ahead was given after meetings between the Football Association of Serbia and Sepp Blatter.

Membership in UEFA and FIFA

In September 2015 at an UEFA Executive Committee meeting in Malta was approved the request from the federation to the admission in UEFA to the next Ordinary Congress to be held in Budapest. On 3 May 2016, at the Ordinary Congress. Kosovo were accepted into UEFA after members voted 28–24 in favor of Kosovo. Ten days later, Kosovo was accepted in FIFA during their 66th congress in Mexico with 141 votes in favour and 23 against.

First tournament

Debut in World Cup and Euro qualifications
Kosovo began to make their debut in the 2019 FIFA Women's World Cup qualification, where Kosovo was drawn with Albania, Greece and Malta. The Kosovars despite the efforts failed to qualify and finished last in the group with three losses.

After failing to qualify for the 2019 FIFA Women's World Cup, Kosovo participated in the UEFA Women's Euro 2021 qualifying, together with Estonia, Russia, Slovenia, Turkey and 2019 World Cup runners-up finisher Netherlands, the Kosovars created their first big surprise, defeating Turkey in a 2–0 home win, which was also the team's first-ever competitive win, victory which increased the enthusiasm which unfortunately did not last long and after the positive results began to experience a decline which resulted in disqualification.

Team image

Nicknames
The Kosovo women's national football team has been known or nicknamed as the "Dardanet (Dardanians)".

Kits and crest
The Kosovan women's national football team wears blue jersey at home matches, white jersey at away matches, black jersey at neutral matches, but mostly this jersey is used as an alternative jersey, following the tradition of the Kosovo men's team. On 5 October 2016, Kosovo signed with Spanish sportswear company Kelme to a four-year contract and was the first official kit suppliers of Kosovo after membership in UEFA and FIFA. On 23 February 2022, Kosovo signed with Italian sportswear company Erreà to a three-year contract for it to the kit suppliers of Kosovo.

Home stadium
Kosovo's home stadium is the Fadil Vokrri Stadium. The stadium capacity is 13,500, which makes it the second largest national stadium in Kosovo. Kosovo's previous national stadium was the Adem Jashari Olympic Stadium which is currently under renovation.

Results and fixtures

 The following is a list of match results in the last 12 months, as well as any future matches that have been scheduled.

Legend

2022

2023

Coaching staff

Current coaching staff

Players

Current squad
The following players were called up for the 2023 Turkish Women's Cup.
All caps and goals as of 21 February 2023 after match against Bulgaria, only matches as FIFA member are included.

Recent call-ups
 The following players have been called up for a squad within the last 12 months and are still available for selection.

Notes
INJ = Not part of the current squad due to injury.
DOC = Is not available due to problems with documentations.

Competitive record
FIFA Women's World Cup
On 19 January 2017, in Nyon, it was decided that Kosovo should be part in Group 2 of the 2019 FIFA Women's World Cup qualification, together with Albania, Greece and Malta. On 6 April 2017, Kosovo made their debut on 2019 FIFA Women's World Cup qualifications with a 3–2 away defeat against Albania.

UEFA Women's Championship
On 21 February 2019, in Nyon, it was decided that Kosovo should be part in Group A of the UEFA Women's Euro 2021 qualifying, together with Estonia, Russia, Slovenia, Turkey and 2019 World Cup runners-up finisher Netherlands. On 30 August 2019, Kosovo made their debut on UEFA Women's Championship qualifying with a 2–0 home win against Turkey, which was also the team's first-ever competitive win.

Turkish Women's Cup
Kosovo has so far participated in two editions of the Turkish Women's Cup, the first time was in the 2017 edition, when Kosovo lost in all three matches of this tournament against Poland (0–5), which was also her first international match as a FIFA member, against Romania (0–3) and against the host Turkey (2–4). A year later, Kosovo again participated in the 2018 edition, when they lost against France (0–6), Ukraine (0–2), draw against Kazakhstan (1–1) and win against Northern Ireland (1–0).

Head-to-head recordHead-to-head records are included only matches as FIFA member.''

See also
Sport in Kosovo
Football in Kosovo
Women's football in Kosovo
Men's
Senior
Under-21
Under-19
Under-17
Under-15
Futsal
Women's
Under-19
Under-17

Notes and references

Notes

References

External links
 
Kosovo (women) News about the team

 
European women's national association football teams